Lock Charmer (Spanish: El cerrajero) is a 2014  Argentine drama film written and directed by Natalia Smirnoff. The film premiered in-competition in the World Cinema Dramatic Competition at 2014 Sundance Film Festival on January 21, 2014.

The film later premiered at the 2014 Fribourg International Film Festival on March 29, 2014.

Plot
Thirty-three-year-old locksmith, Sebastian doesn't believe in committed relationships. He learns from his recent girlfriend, Monica, that she's pregnant but she isn't sure that he is the father. During the same time, he discovers that whenever he fixes someones locks, he gets a vision into their lives, which reveals their feelings. Soon this power starts to complicate his life. After he warns a maid named Daisy that her boyfriend is stealing from her boss, she leaves her boyfriend, and Sebastian takes her in. But when he sees a vision about his own life, Sebastian is forced to examine every aspect of his life.

Cast
Esteban Lamothe as Sebastian
Érica Rivas as Monica 
Yosiria Huaripata as Daisy 
Sergio Boris as Sebastian's father
Arturo Goetz
María Onetto
Luis Ziembrowski
Germán de Silva
Nahuel Mutti
Claudia Cantero

Reception
Lock Charmer received positive reviews upon its premiere at the 2014 Sundance Film Festival. Geoff Berkshire of Variety, said in his review that "Natalia Smirnoff's second feature is a wisp of melancholy comedy with a dose of magical realism." Boyd van Hoeij in his review for The Hollywood Reporter called the film "A modest but quite charming feature about an Argentinean locksmith who unlocks truths about the lives of his clients." Eric Kohn from Indiewire praised the film by saying that "Measured and never indulgent in its depiction of the plot's mystical ingredients, “Lock Charmer” does a great job at blending two genres and placing them in the strangeness of the 2008 setting" and praised the performances of Lamothe and Huaripata that "Lamothe portrays the locksmith as a man at once perturbed by the behavior of the women in his life and resentful towards his male role model — namely, his estranged father. The natural chemistry between him and Huaripata, as Daisy, matches the efficiency of the movie's direction."

Accolades

References

External links
 
 

2014 films
Argentine drama films
2014 drama films
2010s Argentine films